HDMS Nidelven was a brig launched at Copenhagen on 1 December 1792. She was present at both British attacks on Copenhagen (1801 and 1807), and the British Royal Navy seized her at Copenhagen on 7 September 1807 at the surrender of Copenhagen. The British took her into service as HMS Nid Elven. She served between 1808 and 1809, during which time she captured a small French privateer. She was laid up in 1809. The Navy sold her in 1814.

Danish service
Nidelven was one nine Lougen-class brigs designed by the naval architect Ernst Wilhelm Stibolt.

In 1793 Captain Ferdinand A Braun commanded Nidelven in the home fleet, and in 1794–1795 sailed her to the West Indies

In 1796 Captain Hans Michael Kaas (1760 - 1799) cruised the Norwegian coast, enforcing the neutrality rules.

After a period in 1797 as watch ship at Altona, Captain Hans Holsten took Nidelven for two years to the Mediterranean, returning to Copenhagen on 31 October 1800.

During the Battle of Copenhagen (1801) Nidelven served in Olfert Fischer's division in the Inner Run under Chamberlain Steen Bille and did not engage in any actual fighting.

In 1802 the ship saw service in the North Sea under Captain Cornelius Wieugel.

In 1805 Nidelven was in the home squadron under Captain Johan H. E. van Berger.

British service
The British took possession of Nideleven  under the terms of capitulation following the second battle of Copenhagen on 7 September 1807. She arrived at Woolwich on 24 October where she was fitted out from October to 20 March 1808. She was to be renamed Legere but the Admiralty canceled the name change.

After refit she joined the British Navy as HMS Nid Elven. Nid Elven was commissioned in February 1808 under Commander Richard James Lawrence O'Connor for the North Sea.

On 17 December 1808 she captured the French privateer brig General Rapp of eight guns and 41 men. General Rapp had left Danzig (now Gdansk) the evening before.

On 14 May 1809 Ned Elvin captured Tros Softres.

Between 20 September and 9 October Ned Elvin captured five Danish vessels and two boats.  

 was in sight when Nid Elven captured Susanna Catharina. Childers also shared by agreement in Ned Elvins capture of Wohlfarth, and Hans Barend on 19 November 1809.

Nid Elven was laid up in December 1809.

Fate
The "Principal Officers and Commissioners of His Majesty's Navy" offered "Nid Elven, of 311 tons", lying at Sheerness, for sale on 3 November 1814. She sold on that date for £600.

Notes

Citations

References
 
T. A. Topsøe-Jensen og Emil Marquard (1935) “Officerer i den dansk-norske Søetat 1660-1814 og den danske Søetat 1814-1932“. Two volumes. Download here .

Brigs of the Royal Dano-Norwegian Navy
1792 ships
Ships designed by Ernst Wilhelm Stibolt
Ships built in Copenhagen
Captured ships
Brigs of the Royal Navy